Northville Township may refer to:

 Northville Township, LaSalle County, Illinois
 Northville Township, Michigan
 Northville Township, Spink County, South Dakota, in Spink County, South Dakota

Township name disambiguation pages